Charlotte Amalia of Nassau-Dillenburg (1680 in Dillenburg – 1738) was a German regent; regent of Nassau-Usingen from 1718-1732. She was a daughter of Prince Henry of Nassau-Dillenburg and Dorothea Elisabeth, a daughter of George III of Brieg.

In 1706 in Dillenburg, she married Prince William Henry of Nassau-Usingen.  The couple had ten children; the first child was born on 3 April 1707 and the last one on 6 March 1718.

William Henry died in 1718, and Charlotte Amalia became regent for her underage son Charles.

Issue
Four children reached adulthood:
 Françoise (1707–1750)
 Charles, Prince of Nassau-Usingen (1712–1775)
 Hedwig (1714–1786)
 William Henry, prince of Nassau-Saarbrücken (1718–1768)

House of Nassau
1680 births
1738 deaths
18th-century German people
Regents of Germany
German princesses
18th-century women rulers
Daughters of monarchs